Big Thief is an American indie rock band with folk roots based in Brooklyn, New York. Its members are Adrianne Lenker (guitar, vocals), Buck Meek (guitar, backing vocals), Max Oleartchik (bass), and James Krivchenia (drums). 

The band's debut album, Masterpiece, was released on Saddle Creek Records in 2016. Their second studio album, Capacity, was released in 2017. In 2019, the band signed to 4AD and released two studio albums: U.F.O.F. in May 2019 and Two Hands in October 2019. Both albums received critical acclaim; U.F.O.F. was nominated for Best Alternative Music Album at the 62nd Annual Grammy Awards, and the song "Not", was nominated for Best Rock Song and Best Rock Performance at the 63rd Annual Grammy Awards. 

The band's fifth studio album, Dragon New Warm Mountain I Believe in You, was released in February 2022. A double album, it reached the top ten in the Netherlands and was also nominated for Best Alternative Music Album at the 2023 Grammys, while its second single "Certainty" was nominated for Best Alternative Music Performance.

History

2013–2015: Early years
Adrianne Lenker met Buck Meek at a show in Boston, and after meeting him again in Brooklyn as undergraduates, the pair began performing as a duo. They toured as a duo in 2013, and released two EPs, a-sides and b-sides, in 2014. In 2015, after performing for two years and developing a small grassroots following, they began looking for additional members to accompany them, and formed the band Big Thief with the arrival of Max Oleartchik, a bassist and longtime friend of Meek's. James Krivchenia joined the band later, originally as a sound engineer and then as a drummer. All four members of Big Thief attended the Berklee College of Music in Boston, Massachusetts.

2016–2018: Masterpiece and Capacity
The band's debut studio album, Masterpiece was released on Saddle Creek Records on May 27, 2016. It received generally favorable reviews from critics; it has a rating of 79/100 on Metacritic. Bob Boilen from NPR wrote that Big Thief was "a band bound by great songs," and called the title track of Masterpiece "one of the best songs I've heard this year." Jillian Mapes, writing for Pitchfork Media, gave Masterpiece a rating of 7.7 out of 10 saying the songs on the album "sound cherry-picked over a lifetime of writing". Robert Christgau described the album's songs as being "fragile, noisy images of a love perpetually out of reach". Ben Salmon wrote in the Portland Mercury that on the album Big Thief "alternately sounds like an unearthed field recording ("Little Arrow"), a pop band with a broken heart's pulse ("Vegas"), and a classic, buzzy indie-rock outfit ("Interstate")."
On April 4, 2017, Big Thief premiered a new single "Mythological Beauty" on NPR. The next day the band released the single's official video and confirmed that the song would appear on their second studio album, Capacity. The full album was released on June 9 via Saddle Creek. Capacity received critical acclaim upon its release. On Metacritic, which assigns a normalized rating out of 100 to reviews from music critics, the album received an average score of 81 indicating "universal acclaim" based on 15 reviews.

Capacity appeared on multiple album-of-the-year lists, including #1 on NPR's "Bob Boilen's Top Ten Album's of 2017". Boilen said, "I don't recall the last time I had the same band in my top five albums for two years in a row. But this year's Capacity (my No. 1 album) and last year's Masterpiece (my No. 4 album) did just that." Spin named Capacity #2 on their "50 Best Albums of 2017", citing the band's "open engagement with anguish in their bracing songs." The song "Mary" appeared on Pitchfork's 200 Best Songs of the 2010s list, at #44.

2019–2020: U.F.O.F. and Two Hands
U.F.O.F., the band's third studio album was announced on February 26, 2019. The album was recorded at Bear Creek Studio in Woodinville, Washington. On the same day they released the album's first single, its title track, "U.F.O.F.", and announced a new tour across America and in Europe. The band released two more singles, "Cattails" and "Century" ahead of the album release on May 3, 2019. U.F.O.F. received critical acclaim upon its release. It was called "Best New Music" by Pitchfork, scoring a 9.2 and came in at #33 on Pitchfork's 200 Best Albums of the 2010s list. At Metacritic the album received an average score of 87/100. In the first album's release week U.F.O.F. reached the top of Billboard charts, including the #1 position on Alternative New Artist Albums, Americana/Folk Albums, Top New Artist Albums, #2 placement for LP Vinyl Albums, #6 placement for Current Alternative Albums, #8 placement for Current Rock Albums, and #142 for Billboard Top 200 Albums. The band also had 3 sold out album release shows, one the night before the album release in LA  at The Fonda Theatre on May 2, another in LA on May 3 at The Bootleg Theater, and a third night in Brooklyn, NY at Elsewhere on May 5, 2019.

U.F.O.F. was nominated for Best Alternative Music Album at the 62nd Annual Grammy Awards.

Big Thief released their fourth studio album, Two Hands on October 11, 2019. The album was recorded at Sonic Ranch in Tornillo, Texas, shortly after the recording of U.F.O.F. and is billed as its "Earth twin". The album's lead single "Not" was nominated for Best Rock Song and Best Rock Performance at the 63rd Annual Grammy Awards.

2021–present: Dragon New Warm Mountain I Believe in You 
On August 10, 2021, the band released the songs "Little Things" and "Sparrow", both which were produced by Big Thief drummer James Krivchenia. "Little Things" was recorded with Shawn Everett at Five Star Studios in Topanga, California in October 2020. "Sparrow" was recorded with Sam Evian at Flying Cloud Recordings in the Catskills, New York in July and August 2020.

On September 7, 2021, the band released a song "Certainty" followed by another song "Change", on October 6. They also announced plans for a North American tour in 2022.

In the November 2021 issue of Mojo, Big Thief announced their plans to release a 20-track double album in early 2022. The album was recorded in four different locations across the United States after the band quarantined in the Vermont woods for two weeks in July 2020. Later that month the band confirmed the album's title Dragon New Warm Mountain I Believe in You and a February 11, 2022, release date.

In June 2022, the band announced two concert dates in Oleartchik's hometown of Tel Aviv, Israel for July 6 and 7 of the same year. However, the announcement received backlash with criticism pertaining to the Israeli–Palestinian conflict. The band first released a statement defending their decision to perform in Israel, then eventually retracted their previous statement and canceled the concert dates. The cancellation was received with opposite backlash from the concert venue. The band previously performed at the venue in 2017.

At the 65th Annual Grammy Awards, Dragon New Warm Mountain I Believe in You was nominated for Best Alternative Music Album and "Certainty" was nominated for Best Alternative Music Performance.

On February 28, 2023, the band debuted the unreleased "Vampire Empire" with a live performance on The Late Show with Stephen Colbert.

Band members
Current members
Adrianne Lenker – vocals, guitar (2015–present)
Buck Meek – guitar, backing vocals (2015–present)
Max Oleartchik – bass guitar (2015–present)
James Krivchenia – drums (2016–present)

Former member
 Jason Burger – drums (2015–2016)

Discography

Albums

EPs 
 Demos Vol. 1 (2020)
 Live at the Bunker Studio (2021)

Singles

Music videos 

 "Masterpiece" (2016)
 "Humans" (2016) 
 "Mythological Beauty" (2017)
 "Red Moon" (2022)

Notes

Accolades

References

External links 

 

 
4AD artists
Indie rock musical groups from New York (state)
Musical groups from Brooklyn
Saddle Creek Records artists
Musical groups established in 2015
2015 establishments in New York City